The 2014 Campeonato Nacional Apertura Scotiabank was the 95th season of Chilean League top flight soccer. The tournament's champions were Universidad de Chile, who won their seventeenth League title.

Teams

Stadia and locations

Personnel and kits

Standings

Results

Pre-Copa Libertadores Liguilla
Following the conclusion of the regular season, the teams placed 2nd to 5th qualify for the Liguilla in order to determine qualifying spots for the following international tournaments:
Winner qualifies for 2015 Copa Libertadores first stage (Chile 3).
Runner-up qualifies for 2015 Copa Sudamericana first stage (Chile 4).

Colo-Colo, placed 3rd, was ineligible to compete due to having already qualified for Copa Libertadores as champions of the previous tournament.

Semifinals 

Santiago Wanderers won 6–5 on aggregate.

Palestino won 6–1 on aggregate.

Final 

Palestino won 9–2 on aggregate and qualified for the 2015 Copa Libertadores. Santiago Wanderers, as runners-up, qualified for the 2015 Copa Sudamericana.

References

External links
2014 Torneo Apertura at Soccerway

Primera División de Chile seasons
Chile
Aper